Shell Beach, located on the Atlantic coast of Guyana in the Barima-Waini Region, near the Venezuelan border, is a nesting site for four of the eight sea turtle species - the Green, Hawksbill turtleill, Leatherback and the Olive Ridley. Shell Beach extends for approximately 120 km.

Turtles used to be slaughtered for their meat and eggs but are now part of a non-governmental conservation program called the Guyana Marine Turtle Conservation Society (GMTCS), founded by Dr. Peter Pritchard and Romeo De Freitas. Shell Beach was not formally protected, although direct and indirect conservation activities to protect the nesting sea turtles started in the 1960s, when Dr. Peter Pritchard first began annual research visits. Due to his efforts to conserve the turtles in the region, Dr. Peter Pritchard was dubbed "Hero of the Planet" by Time. As of 2011, it is a protected area, and Amerindians from the local communities of Almond Beach, Gwennie Beach, and nine other villages within the area are involved in the programme.

References

Barima-Waini
Beaches of Guyana
Natural history of Guyana
Protected areas of Guyana